Dmitrii Baskov (born 19 December 1994) is a Moldovan tennis player.

Baskov has a career high ATP singles ranking of 1,702 achieved on 27 October 2014. He also has a career high ATP doubles ranking of 1,372 achieved on 30 December 2019.

In January 2020, he participated at the ATP Cup as a member of the Moldovan team.

Baskov represents Moldova at the Davis Cup, where he has a W/L record of 5–3.

Davis Cup

Participations: (5–3)

   indicates the outcome of the Davis Cup match followed by the score, date, place of event, the zonal classification and its phase, and the court surface.

References

External links

1994 births
Living people
Moldovan male tennis players
Sportspeople from Chișinău
21st-century Moldovan people